Thomas Hope (30 August 17692 February 1831) the "Furniture Hope" was a Dutch and British interior decorator, Regency designer, traveler, author, philosopher, art collector, and a member of the bankers Hope & Co. He is best known for introducing the Greek Revival architecture, opening his house as a museum and his novel Anastasius, a work which many experts considered a rival to the writings of Lord Byron.

Early life and family 

The eldest son of Jan Hope, Thomas descended from a branch of an old Scottish family (Quakers) who for several generations were merchant bankers known as the Hopes of Amsterdam, or Hope & Co. He was baptized on 3 September in English Reformed Church, Amsterdam. He had two brothers, Adrian Elias (1772-1834), an innovative gardener, and Henry Philip (1774-1839), a collector of gems and jewelry. Hope was possibly painted as a boy by Guy Head who visited Amsterdam c.1780. Thomas inherited a love of the arts from his parents.  His father spent his final years turning his summer home Groenendaal Park in Heemstede into a grand park of sculpture open to the public.

Grand tour

In 1784, when young Thomas was fifteen, his father died unexpectedly in the Hague just after purchasing Bosbeek, the mansion that was to house his large art collection. He shared his art collection as part of the Hope & Co. partnership with his cousin Henry Hope. At the age of eighteen, Thomas began to devote more and more of his time to the study of all the arts, especially the architecture of classical civilization. During his eight-year grand tour through Europe, Asia and Africa, Thomas interested himself especially in architecture and sculpture, making a large collection of artifacts which attracted his attention (e.g. the Hope Dionysus).

Not long after his mother died early January 1790 he received the rights and liabilities of a person of full age and was admitted to the board of the Hope company; he owned almost a sixth of the shares, and a millionaire. Between 1792 and 1794 he and Henry Philip traveled in Italy, buying antiquities (Venus, restored by Antonio Canova). Henry Hope was the executor of their mother's will in June 1794; Thomas received the largest and most expensive mansion on Herengracht. On 24 December 1794 he crashed in the Watergraafsmeer with another chaise.  (On 27 December the French general Pichegru crossed the Meuse on the ice and moved north.) Within a few weeks he  fled to London to avoid the Batavian Revolution and the French occupation of the Netherlands and never returned.

Escape to London

The Hope brothers, under the protection of their uncle, took 372 paintings with them. Among these were important works by Frans Hals, Peter Paul Rubens, Rembrandt and Sir Anthony van Dyck. The Hopes left their mansions, full of wall decorations, furniture, and heavy statuary. Henry settled at the corner of Harley Street and Cavendish Square, Thomas at Hanover Square. Later in 1795 two brothers went to Rome. In 1799 he was back in Athens. In 1802, Thomas's younger brother Adrian Elias, who was declared insane, would return to live at Groenendaal Park and expand the gardens. The brothers sold the real estate at Keizers- and Prinsengracht to John Williams Hope. Also Henry sold Villa Welgelegen to this fiduciary, who continued to hold that office until the establishment of the monarchy under Louis Bonaparte in 1806.

Career as an interior decorator

In 1799, the Hopes established a residence in London in Duchess Street, off Portland Place, designed by Robert Adam. Thomas remodeled it in an Egyptian style. Experienced from his extensive travel, Thomas Hope enjoyed the cosmopolitan atmosphere of London, while his younger brothers missed their home in the Netherlands. He decorated the mansion in a very elaborate style, from drawings made himself with each room taking on a different style influenced by the countries he had visited. In essence, the combined art collections of Hope & Co., his parents and Henry Hope gave him the opportunity to further research the various art he had studied during his travels. Thomas began to write books on decoration and furniture, the first of its kind. 

In this eclectic wealthy residence of bachelors, younger brother Henry Philip oversaw the gem collection (acquiring the Hope Diamond and the Hope Pearl), while cousin Henry busied himself with the banking business and the Louisiana Purchase, together with Barings. Thomas Hope did not settle in London, however. He took up his grand tour where he left off, and in 1796 he began his extensive tours of the Ottoman Empire, which included visits to Turkey, Rhodes, Egypt, Syria, and Arabia. He stayed for about a year in Constantinople and produced some 350 drawings depicting the people and places he witnessed, a collection now to be found in the Benaki Museum, Athens.

During these travels, he was given free rein by the Hope & Co. firm to collect many paintings, sculptures, antique objects and books, some of which were destined to be displayed for the public in Amsterdam in the branch offices on Keizersgracht 444, and some of which were destined for his London house in Duchess Street in 1804.

In 1801, he bought a  collection of Greek vases from William Hamilton. During the Treaty of Amiens he started to travel again. In 1803 he ordered Jason with the Golden Fleece, a sculpture by Thorvaldsen in Copenhagen City Hall, included in the semi-official Danish Culture Canon. Thomas Hope first opened his new galleries to the public, on 10 February 1804.

The Egyptian Gallery, a private room in the home of Thomas Hope to display his Egyptian antiquities, and illustrated in engravings from his meticulous line drawings in his book Household Furniture (1807), were a prime source for the Regency style of British furnishings.

Marriage and move to Deepdene

After his marriage to Louisa de la Poer Beresford (daughter of William Beresford, 1st Baron Decies) in 1806, Hope acquired a country seat at Deepdene, near Dorking in Surrey. Here, surrounded by his large collections of paintings, sculptures and antiques, Deepdene became a famous resort of men of letters as well as of people of fashion. Among the luxuries suggested by his fine taste, and provided to his guests, was a miniature library in several languages in each bedroom.

He also gave frequent employment to artists, sculptors and craftsmen. Bertel Thorvaldsen, the Danish sculptor, was indebted to him for the early recognition of his talents. He was also a patron to Francis Legatt Chantrey and John Flaxman; it was to his order that the latter illustrated the writings of Dante Alighieri. He developed the gardens in a particular version of picturesque style.

Hope was noted for his snobbery and ugliness, one contemporary describing him as "undoubtedly far from the most agreeable man in Europe. He is a little ill-looking man…with an effeminate face and manner." When the French painter Antoine Dubost exhibited a portrait of him titled "Beauty and the Beast", portraying him as a monster offering his wife jewels, it caused a public scandal: the painting was mutilated by Louisa's brother. A further scandal arose in 1810 when Hope took up with a beautiful young Greek sailor, Aide, and attempted to launch him into Society.

Hope was the father of Henry Thomas Hope, art patron and politician and Alexander James Beresford Beresford Hope, author and politician.

Writing

Hope was eager to advance public awareness of historical painting and design and to influence design in the grand houses of Regency London. In pursuit of his scholarly projects, he began sketching furniture, room interiors and costumes, and publishing books with his accompanying scholarly texts.

In 1807 Thomas Hope published sketches of his furniture, in a folio volume, titled Household Furniture and Interior Decoration, which had considerable influence and brought about a change in the upholstery and interior decoration of houses. Hope's furniture designs were in the pseudo-classical manner generally called "English Empire". It was sometimes extravagant, and often heavy, but was much more restrained than the wilder and later flights of Thomas Sheraton in this style.

In 1809 he published the Costumes of the Ancients, and in 1812 Designs of Modern Costumes, works which display a large amount of antiquarian research. A Historical Essay on Architecture, which featured illustrations based on early Hope drawings, was published posthumously by his family in 1835.<ref>{{cite book|title=A Historical Essay on Architecture by the late Thomas Hope, compiled by Edward Cresy|year=1835|edition= 2nd|location=London|publisher=J. Murray|url=https://catalog.hathitrust.org/Record/100240942}}</ref> Thus Hope became famous in London's aristocratic circles as 'the costume and furniture man'. The sobriquet was regarded as a compliment by his enthusiastic supporters, but for his critics, including Lord Byron, it was a term of ridicule.

 1807: Household Furniture and Interior Decoration. Faksimile-Neuausgabe 1937.
 1809: Costumes of the Ancients. 1812: Designs of Modern Costumes. 1819: Anastasius, or Memoirs of a Modern Greek. (Roman)
 1831: Origin and Prospect of Man. 1835: Historical Essay on Architecture.Anastasius

 

At age fifty, Hope began work on a novel from the suggestion of a few friends. The first edition of Anastasius was complete in 1819 and was released by London publisher John Murray. Foreign translations in French, German and Flemish followed.

The novel lifted a curtain of ignorance about the East without being a mere retelling of Hope's own travels. The eponymous narrator-hero Anastasius was fearless, curious, cunning, ruthless, brave and, above all, sexy. As a newly converted Muslim mercenary soldier, Selim, his travels threw him among friends, lovers and enemies.

Hope's descriptions revealed the lives of the inhabitants of the Ottoman Empire and provided astonishing glimpses of the wars fought among the Turks, Russians and Wahabees. It also described many previously unknown details of Islamic culture: music, language, cuisine, religion, laws and literature.

Because of his modesty, Hope originally chose not to declare his authorship of Anastasius in the first edition. Ironically, given Hope's mild reputation, the authorship of the dashing Anastasius was at first mistakenly attributed to Lord Byron, who, according to legend, confided to Marguerite, Countess of Blessington, that he wept bitterly on reading it. "To have been the author of Anastasius, I would have given the two poems which brought me the most glory." These events prompted Hope to reveal his identity as author in later editions, adding a map of Anastasius's travels and fine-tuning the text, although his authorship was initially greeted with incredulity by some journals.

Soon after Hope's death in 1831, his widow Louisa remarried her cousin William Carr Beresford, 1st Viscount Beresford. His family thereafter embraced conservative values, causing them to authorise the demolition of the writer's legendary London home, disperse his fabled art collection, and distance themselves from his Oriental masterpiece. No substantial collection of Hope's personal papers survived the family indifference and Anastasius, his magnum opus, became a victim of the sanctimonious morality of the Victorian age.

Nevertheless, it influenced the later works of William Thackeray, Mark Twain and Herman Melville. More recently, the noted Orientalist Robert Irwin wrote, "this book, one of the most important books of the nineteenth century, should be much more widely read."

In addition to his other accomplishments, Hope was the author of an important philosophical work published posthumously, The Origin and Prospect of Man (1831), in which his speculations diverged widely from the social and religious views of the Victorian age. This volume, which has been cited by the philosopher Roger Scruton, was a highly eclectic work and took a global view of the challenges facing humanity.

In his obituary published in The Mirror of Literature, Amusement, and Instruction Volume 17, No. 476, Saturday, 12 February 1831, it was written, "We remember the opinion of a writer in the Edinburgh Review, soon after the publication of Anastasius''. With a degree of pleasantry and acumen peculiar to northern criticism, he asks, 'Where has Mr. Hope hidden all his eloquence and poetry up to this hour? How is it that he has, all of a sudden, burst out into descriptions which would not disgrace the pen of Tacitus, and displayed a depth of feeling and vigor of imagination which Lord Byron could not excel? We do not shrink from one syllable of this eulogy.'"

Still commonly known among literary circles as "Anastasius Hope", the combined artistic legacy of Thomas Hope is still of universal interest and importance.

Death and legacy

In early 1831 Hope fell ill. He died on 2 February at Duchess Street; and was laid to rest on 12 February in the mausoleum at Deepdene. In his later years he had cemented his position in society, despite never obtaining a peerage. By the time of his death his contribution to art and architecture had been widely recognised.

The two mansions Hope created have been lost; that in Duchess Street was demolished by his son in 1851 and Deepdene in 1969. The only complete surviving structure built by Hope is the Deepdene mausoleum. Built in 1818, the structure was the first recorded work at Deepdene. It was permanently sealed in 1957 and buried in 1960. The Mausolea and Monuments Trust has been working with Mole Valley District Council to rescue the structure and is running a campaign to excavate and repair it. The principal elevation was excavated in 2013, with further restoration in 2016.

References

Sources

The Beechey Portrait – A Visual Study of "Anastasius" by John Rodenbeck
Thomas Hope – Triumph, Tragedy, Obverse Worlds by Jerry Nolan
A Political Study of Anastasius by Ludmilla Kostova
Hope's Philosophical Excursus by Roger Scruton
Anastasius – Towards Background and Meaning by John Rodenbeck
Sándor Baumgarten – Hope's Forgotten Champion by Jerry Nolan
 Catalogue of the valuable library of books on architecture, costume, sculpture, antiquities, etc., formed by Thomas Hope, Esq., author of "The costume of the ancients," "Anastasius, or memoirs of a Greek," etc., etc. ; being a portion of the Hope Heirlooms removed from Deepdene, Dorking ; the property of Lord Francis Pelham Clinton Hope : which will be sold by auction ... on Wednesday, July 25, 1917 and two following days.

Further reading
 
 
 
 
 David Watkin (historian): Thomas Hope's house in Duchess Street. Apollo, London 2004.

External links

The Deepdene Trail
Deepdene entry from The DiCamillo Companion to British & Irish Country Houses
Thomas Hope: Regency Designer2008 exhibition at the Victoria and Albert Museum
Portrait of Thomas Hope (National Portrait Gallery, London) 
Anastasius Vol. 1 Anastasius Vol. 2 Anastasius Vol. 3 at the Internet Archive.

1769 births
1831 deaths
Thomas
English travel writers
English furniture designers
19th-century English novelists
Art collectors from Amsterdam
English art collectors
Businesspeople from Amsterdam
Artists from London
People from Heemstede
Dutch people of Scottish descent
English people of Scottish descent
Fellows of the Royal Society
English male novelists
19th-century English male writers
English male non-fiction writers